The Pakistan national beach handball team is the men's beach handball team that has represented Pakistan in international competitions. It is governed by the Pakistan Handball Federation.

Pakistan has one of the most successful national beach handball teams from South Asia in international competitions, having won the Asian Championship in 2007 and Asian Beach Games in 2008. Pakistan national team made their debut in IHF World Championship at the 2008 edition, finishing at 10th position. Pakistan have won a total of 8 official international medals to professional and grassroots level selections, with one gold and silver medal along with three bronze medals in the Asian Beach Games beach handball tournaments held in Bali 2008, Muscat 2010, Haiyang 2012, Phuket 2014 and Danang 2016, respectively.

Iqbal Stadium in Faisalabad is team's home ground, although most of their home games are frequently played in other venues across the country.

World Championship results

Asian Championship results

External links
 IHF profile

National beach handball teams
Handball